The 1998 Korean FA Cup, known as the 1998 Sambo Change Up FA Cup, was the third edition of the Korean FA Cup.

Bracket

First round

Round of 16

Quarter-finals

Semi-finals

Final

Awards
Source:

See also
1998 in South Korean football
1998 K League
1998 Korean League Cup
1998 Korean League Cup (Supplementary Cup)

References

External links
Official website
Fixtures & Results at KFA

1998
1998 in South Korean football
1998 domestic association football cups